Harlem Township may refer to one of the following places in the State of Illinois:

 Harlem Township, Stephenson County, Illinois
 Harlem Township, Winnebago County, Illinois

See also

Harlem Township (disambiguation)

Illinois township disambiguation pages